Morten Thoresen (born 2 January 1997) is a Norwegian Greco-Roman wrestler. He won the gold medal in the 67 kg event at the 2020 European Wrestling Championships held in Rome, Italy. He hails from Bodø.

Career 

In 2018, he won one of the bronze medals in the men's 67 kg event at the European U23 Wrestling Championship held in Istanbul, Turkey. A month earlier, he competed in the 67 kg event at the European Wrestling Championships without winning a medal. He was eliminated in his second match by Fredrik Bjerrehuus of Denmark. In 2019, he competed in the 67 kg event at the World Wrestling Championships held in Nur-Sultan, Kazakhstan without winning a medal. He was eliminated in his second match by Frank Stäbler of Germany.

In January 2021, he won the silver medal in the 67 kg event at the Grand Prix Zagreb Open held in Zagreb, Croatia. In March 2021, he competed at the European Qualification Tournament in Budapest, Hungary hoping to qualify for the 2020 Summer Olympics in Tokyo, Japan. He did not qualify at this tournament and he also failed to qualify for the Olympics at the World Olympic Qualification Tournament held in Sofia, Bulgaria. In October 2021, he competed in the 67 kg event at the World Wrestling Championships held in Oslo, Norway. He was eliminated in his third match by eventual bronze medalist Almat Kebispayev of Kazakhstan.

In 2022, he won the silver medal in his event at the Vehbi Emre & Hamit Kaplan Tournament held in Istanbul, Turkey. He competed in the 67 kg event at the European Wrestling Championships in Budapest, Hungary where he was eliminated in his second match. A few months later, he competed at the Matteo Pellicone Ranking Series 2022 held in Rome, Italy. He competed in the 67 kg event at the 2022 World Wrestling Championships held in Belgrade, Serbia.

Achievements

References

External links 

 

Living people
1997 births
Place of birth missing (living people)
Sportspeople from Bodø
Norwegian male sport wrestlers
European Wrestling Championships medalists
European Wrestling Champions
20th-century Norwegian people
21st-century Norwegian people